Fifteen-inch gauge railways were pioneered by Sir Arthur Percival Heywood who was interested in what he termed a minimum gauge railway for use as estate railways or to be easy to lay on, for instance, a battlefield. In 1874, he described the principle behind it as used for his Duffield Bank Railway, distinguishing it from a "narrow-gauge" railway. Having previously built a small railway of  gauge, he settled on  gauge as the minimum that he felt was practical.

Railways

See also

Bassett-Lowke
 British narrow-gauge railways
Heritage railway
 List of British heritage and private railways
List of track gauges
Minimum-gauge railway

References

 
Minimum gauge railways